Group B of the 2012 Fed Cup Americas Zone Group II was one of two pools in the Americas zone of the 2012 Fed Cup. Five teams competed in a round robin competition, with the teams proceeding to their respective sections of the play-offs: the top two teams played for advancement to the 2013 Group I.

Mexico vs. Costa Rica

Puerto Rico vs. Uruguay

Chile vs. Mexico

Puerto Rico vs. Costa Rica

Chile vs. Puerto Rico

Uruguay vs. Costa Rica

Chile vs. Uruguay

Mexico vs. Puerto Rico

Chile vs. Costa Rica

Mexico vs. Uruguay

See also
Fed Cup structure

References

External links
 Fed Cup website

2012 Fed Cup Americas Zone